Mala Pristava is a settlement in the Municipality of Šmarje pri Jelšah in eastern Slovenia. It lies in the hills just north of Šmarje. The area is part of the historical Styria region. The municipality is now included in the Savinja Statistical Region.

Remains of four to six Roman buildings have been identified in the hamlet of Grobeljšek in the settlement. One was excavated in the early 20th century.

References

External links
Mala Pristava at Geopedia

Populated places in the Municipality of Šmarje pri Jelšah